Live At Raul's is an album by The Big Boys and The Dicks. In 1992, Selfless Records issued a double 7" called Live at Raul's Club featuring 6 songs from this record (three from each group) along with 2 previously unreleased live songs.

Track listing

The Big Boys
1. Detectives
2. Out of Focus
3. Psycho
4. Red/Green
5. In the City
6. Nightbeat
7. After 12:00

The Dicks
1. Fake Bands
2. Dicks Hate the Police
3. Dead In a Motel Room
4. Wheelchair Epidemic
5. Babysit
6. Shit On Me
7. Lifetime Problems
8. Suicide Note
9. Shit Fool
10. Love Song

Reissue track listing

The Big Boys

 TV
 Nightbeat
 After 12:00
 Psycho

The Dicks
 Fake Bands
 Shit Fool
 Kill From the Heart
 Shit On Me

References

The Dicks albums
1980 live albums
Split albums
Big Boys albums
Skate punk albums